Eigner is a surname. Notable people with the surname include:

Andreas Eigner (1801–1870), German painter
Christian Eigner (born 1971), Austrian musician
Ignaz Eigner (1854–1922), Austrian lithographer and painter
Larry Eigner (1927–1996), American poet
Ty Eigner (born 1968), American ice hockey coach